James Nelson (1938 – 9 March 2015) was an Irish hurling manager from Antrim.	
 
He was the manager of the Antrim team that reached the 1989 All-Ireland Senior Hurling Championship Final against Tipperary, which was Antrim's first final in 46 years.

References

1938 births
2015 deaths
Hurling managers
Hurling selectors
St Paul's (Antrim) hurlers